Aphonopelma steindachneri is a species of spider in the family Theraphosidae, found in United States (California) and Mexico (Baja California).

References

steindachneri
Spiders of the United States
Spiders of Mexico
Spiders described in 1875